This is a list of Danish television related events from 1989.

Events
25 March - Birthe Kjær is selected to represent Denmark at the 1989 Eurovision Song Contest with her song "Vi maler byen rød". She is selected to be the twenty-second Danish Eurovision entry during Dansk Melodi Grand Prix held at the Bella Centre in Copenhagen.

Debuts

Television shows

Births
15 September - Thomas Ernst, actor
22 September - Sofie Linde Lauridsen, actress & TV host

Deaths

See also
1989 in Denmark